Warriors of Faith is a 1947 Czech historical film by Vladimír Borský, based on a play by Alois Jirásek. It was the first Czech film in colour. It premiered in Prague on 28 March 1947, and the premiere was attended by Czechoslovak president Edvard Beneš.

Cast
Otomar Korbelář as Jan Roháč z Dubé
Ladislav Boháč as Jan Rokycana
Emil Bolek as Puškař Zelený
Felix Le Breux as Výšek Račický
Otto Čermák as Sigismund, Holy Roman Emperor
Rudolf Deyl Jr. as Hrdinka
Gustav Ekl as Orságh
Lilli Hodáčová as Ludmila
František Kulhánek as Hynek Ptáček z Pirkenštejna
Antonín Kurš as Jakub Vlk
Bohumil Machník as Ambrož z Hradce
Viktor Nejedlý as Martin z Prostředka
Viktor Očásek as Filibert z Coutances
Karel Pavlík as Příbram
Theodor Pištěk as Velvar
Jiří Plachý as Oldřich z Rožmberka
Vojta Plachý-Tůma as Palomar
Jaroslav Vojta as Baba
Hermína Vojtová as Taborite woman
Aleš Podhorský as Menhart
Karel Rint as Bedřich ze Strážnice

Plot
The film is set after the Battle of Lipany, where the Radical Hussites are defeated. Only Jan Roháč refuses to surrender. He gathers his loyal followers at Sion Castle and organises resistance against King Sigismund. The castle is placed under siege and eventually defeated after a heavy battle. Jan Roháč is captured and hanged on Sigismund's orders. It angers the Czech people, who revolt against Sigismund, who is forced to run away.

References

External links
 

1947 films
Czechoslovak drama films
1940s Czech-language films
Czech historical drama films
Films about Hussite Wars
Films based on works by Alois Jirásek
1940s historical films
1940s Czech films
Czech epic films